Konstantinos "Kostas" Arkoudeas (born 31 March 1973) is a retired welterweight Greco-Roman wrestler from Greece. He won a silver medal in the 62 kg division at the 1993 Mediterranean Games and placed ninth and sixth at the 1992 and 2004 Olympics, respectively. Until his retirement in 2005, Arkoudeas trained at Ethnikos Piraeus F.C. under his father Panagiotis Arkoudeas.

Arkoudeas made his international debut at the 1992 Summer Olympics in Barcelona, where he placed ninth in the 62 kg division. Twelve years later, he qualified for his second Olympics, as a 31-year-old veteran, in the 66 kg class when Greece hosted the 2004 Summer Olympics in Athens. He filled up an entry by the International Federation of Association Wrestling and the Hellenic Olympic Committee, as Greece received an automatic berth for being the host nation. He started with a 9–3 victory over Oscar Wood, before losing his next match 1–4 to Mkhitar Manukyan. In his final match against Jannis Zamanduridis, Arkoudeas pulled from a 2–2 tie to win in overtime, but fell short to advance to the quarterfinals, finishing second in the preliminary pool.

References

External links
 

1973 births
Living people
Greek male sport wrestlers
Olympic wrestlers of Greece
Wrestlers at the 1992 Summer Olympics
Wrestlers at the 2004 Summer Olympics
Sportspeople from Athens
Mediterranean Games silver medalists for Greece
Competitors at the 1993 Mediterranean Games
Mediterranean Games medalists in wrestling